Valmer may refer to:

 Jimmy Valmer, a fictional character from the American animated television series South Park
 La Croix-Valmer, Var, France, commune
 Villa Valmer, a historic mansion in Marseille, Bouches-du-Rhône, France
 Jean-Auguste-Gustave Binet (1875–1940), Franco-Swiss novelist and journalist with the pen name Binet-Valmer